Nellikunnu is an Indian village. It is 2 km away from Kasaragod. Nellikunnu means "the mountain of nellika" (a fruit). Many historical monuments, including the tomb of Thangal Uppapa and many shrines, are located in this province.

Thangal Uppapa
Thangal Uppapa is mystic saint hailing from Kollam, Kerala. His tomb locates at Nellikunnu, 2 km away from Kasaragod, is pilgrimage centre.

Muhyaddin Juma Masjid
Nellikunnu Muhyaddin Juma Masjid, one of primitive masjids in Kasaragod, houses the tomb of Thangal Uppapa and also include huge number of believers. It is also considered as the center of religious unity in the locality. It is believed that the construction of the mosque is earlier than the arrival of Thangal Uppapa.

Badriya Masjid Nellikunnu Beach Road

It is believed that the site of this masjid was the place of the saint's usual sitting.

Anvarul Uloom Aided Upper primary School
Anvarul Uloom Aided Upper Primary School, Nellikunnu (A.U.A.U.P.School) is a primary school managed by Thangal Uppapa committee and aided by Kerala government. It is established under auspicious occasion to promote the educational activities among backward communities of mappila and fisheries.

Gov. Voccasional Higher Secondary School for Girls
Gov. Voccasional Higher Secondary School for Girls, one of main girls-only school in Kasaragod, locates in Nellikunnu. It provides all educational facilities for girls of location and promote women education of the district...

The Peace Public School
Peace Public School is private school, affording international facilities for students.

The Guide School
The Guide School is private school owned Iqbal. There is nursery school also active under the management.

Light house

Light house, the sole type in Kasaragod, locates in this location. It was built under the Kochi shipyard.

Image gallery

References

Suburbs of Kasaragod